Federico Finchelstein is an Argentine historian and chair of the history department at the New School for Social Research and is director of the Janey Program in Latin American Studies.

After receiving his undergraduate education at the University of Buenos Aires, he received his Ph.D. from Cornell University in 2006. He has previously taught at Brown University.

He is an expert on transatlantic Fascism and the modern history of Argentina. He has  authored books on populism, Dirty Wars, the Holocaust and Jewish history in Latin America and Europe. He has been a commentator on politics in The Guardian and The New York Times, as well as other publications in Argentina and elsewhere.

Recent books
A Brief History of Fascist Lies (2020)
From Fascism to Populism in History (2017)
The Ideological Origins of the Dirty War: Fascism, Populism, and Dictatorship in Twentieth-Century Argentina (2014)
Transatlantic Fascism: Ideology, Violence and the Sacred in Argentina and Italy, 1919-1945 (2010)

References

External links
Faculty page at the New School
Curriculum Vitae

Finchelstein
Finchelstein
Finchelstein
Finchelstein
Male non-fiction writers